Dewey Follett Bartlett Jr. (born March 16, 1947) is an American politician and businessman who served as the 39th Mayor of Tulsa, Oklahoma. An oil industry executive and political figure in Tulsa, Bartlett was the Republican nominee for mayor of Tulsa in the 2009 election, and was elected as Tulsa's 39th mayor on November 10, 2009. He was re-elected in 2013, but was defeated in his second reelection bid in 2016.

Background

Bartlett's father, Dewey F. Bartlett, was Oklahoma's second Republican governor from 1967 to 1971, and a United States senator from 1973 to 1979.  His mother, Ann Bartlett, is a former First Lady of Oklahoma. The younger Bartlett attended Bishop Kelley High School in Tulsa, then received a B.S. in accounting from Regis University and an M.B.A. from Southern Methodist University.  He is the President of the Keener Oil & Gas Company, the successor to a family business previously run by his father, and has served as the chairman of the Oklahoma Energy Resources Board and the National Stripper Well Association,  as well as a member of the board of the Oklahoma Turnpike Authority.

Political career

Bartlett served on the Tulsa City Council from 1990 to 1994, and ran unsuccessfully for mayor in a 1992 special election. The Tulsa World  newspaper suggested that Bartlett lost the race due to extremely negative campaigning.  In 2004 he ran against former state health secretary Tom Adelson for Oklahoma Senate district 33, losing by less than 1,000 votes.

In 2009 he ran again for mayor of Tulsa. On September 8, 2009, Bartlett won 54% of the Republican primary vote, setting him up for another match against Adelson (who received 94% of the vote in the Democratic primary) and two independents in the November general election.  In the November 10 general election, Bartlett received about 45% of the vote, to 36% for Adelson and 18% for independent Mark Perkins.  Bartlett took office on December 7, 2009.

In May 2011, the Tulsa city auditor issued a report stating that Bartlett had violated two sections of the city's ethics rules by accepting free legal advice from a lawyer who had also represented the city.  Bartlett and his lawyer have disputed this finding.

In the 2013 mayoral election, Bartlett faced challenges from his Democratic predecessor, Kathy Taylor, as well as from another Republican, city councilman Bill Christiansen, and several other candidates.  In the mayoral primary election on June 11, 2013, the city used a new non-partisan election system for the first time, and Bartlett finished second, with 34.2%, behind Taylor's 42.1% but ahead of Christiansen's 23.1%.  Taylor and Bartlett then met in a runoff election on November 12, 2013, and Bartlett won reelection with 55.7% of the vote.

In 2016, Bartlett lost reelection to city councilor and fellow Republican G. T. Bynum, who received about 56 percent of the vote while Bartlett had about 38 percent.

References

External links
 Bio - Mayor Dewey F. Bartlett Jr. at City of Tulsa website

1947 births
Living people
Mayors of Tulsa, Oklahoma
Oklahoma city council members
Oklahoma Republicans
Regis University alumni
Southern Methodist University alumni
20th-century American politicians
21st-century American politicians
Candidates in the 1992 United States elections